This is a list of the largest deficits overcome to win NFL games, from either the regular season or the postseason. Wins after trailing by 25 points or more have been rare in NFL history, with only nine in over 100 years, including four in the postseason. There have also been two ties after trailing by such a deficit. Comebacks from 24 points behind have been relatively common, with seventeen occurrences (two in the playoffs).

The record for the largest NFL comeback is held by the Minnesota Vikings, who overcame a third-quarter deficit of 33–0 to defeat the Indianapolis Colts 39–36 in overtime. The Colts have featured in three of the top six comebacks, having also won from 28 points behind and lost from 26 points ahead. The biggest playoff comeback was made by the Buffalo Bills when they won from 35–3 back in the 1992 wild card round, while the biggest Super Bowl comeback came in Super Bowl LI, when the New England Patriots erased a 28–3 deficit against the Atlanta Falcons.

Quarterback Matt Ryan started on both the losing Falcons team in Super Bowl LI and the beaten Colts team in 2022. By contrast, head coach Marv Levy led the Bills to two of the three biggest comebacks of the 20th century.

Largest deficits overcome to win 

<div style="display:inline-table; vertical-align:top;">

Largest deficits overcome to tie

Notes

References 

National Football League lists
National Football League records and achievements